Attentive user interfaces (AUI) are user interfaces that manage the user's attention. For instance, an AUI can manage notifications, deciding when to interrupt the user, the kind of warnings, and the level of detail of the messages presented to the user.
Attentive user interfaces, by generating only the relevant information, can in particular be used to display information in a way that increase the effectiveness of the interaction.

According to Roel Vertegaal, there are four main types of attentive user interfaces:
 Visual attention 
 Turn management
 Interruption decision interfaces
 Visual detail management interfaces

See also 
 Adaptive hypermedia
 Attention management
 Principles of attention stress

References

User interface techniques
Attention